National Highway 715 (NH 715) is a  National Highway in India. It connects Tezpur and Jhanji in Assam.

References

Transport in Tezpur
National highways in India
National Highways in Assam